Feidlimid mac Tigernaig (died 588) was a King of Munster from the Raithlind branch of the Eoganachta. This branch of the family only rarely provided a king in Munster. He succeeded Fergus Scandal mac Crimthainn as king in 582.

A proverb stated that every descendant of Echu (his great-great grandfather) shall not go to Cashel even if he was King of Munster. This applied to Feidlimid who was barred from Cashel and instead built the fort of Bodumbir, south of the capital. He had married Cumman, the widow of Coirpre Cromm mac Crimthainn thereby claiming the throne. The kinglists of the Laud Synchronisms omit him from the list and instead substitute Feidlimid mac Coirpri Chruimm in favor of the Glendamnach branch.

Notes

See also
Kings of Munster

References

Annals of Tigernach
Francis J.Byrne, Irish Kings and High-Kings
Book of Leinster,{MS folio 150a} Fland cecinit.
Laud Synchronisms
The Chronology of the Irish Annals, Daniel P. McCarthy

External links
CELT: Corpus of Electronic Texts at University College Cork

Kings of Munster
588 deaths
6th-century Irish monarchs
Year of birth unknown